Mark Vaillant (born September 8, 1989 in Philadelphia, Pennsylvania) is a French former figure skater. He is a two-time Crystal Skate of Romania medalist and a two-time French national junior bronze medalist. At the 2009 World Junior Championships, he qualified to the free skate and finished 18th overall.

Earlier in his career, he competed in domestic events in the United States as a single skater and as a pair skater with Mariclair Vaillant.

Vaillant holds dual French-American citizenship. He attended Sciences Po Paris before working in emerging markets at Goldman Sachs in London.

Programs

Competitive highlights
JGP: ISU Junior Grand Prix

References

External links
 

French male single skaters
Sportspeople from Philadelphia
Living people
1989 births
University of Paris alumni